Essen is a small hamlet in the municipality of Groningen in the province of Groningen. It lies between the city of Groningen and the village of Haren.

In 1215 a monastery was founded in Essen (or Yesse). It existed until 1594. During the Protestant Reformation it was closed down by the province of Groningen. It was known for having a miraculous statue of Mary (mother of Jesus). Only the terrain on which the monastery was built is recognisable.

The existence of Essen is being threatened by plans to build a new beltway, the Zuidtangent. The municipality of Haren has so far resisted these plans.

References

Groningen (city)
Populated places in Groningen (province)